Mircea Bedivan (born 8 October 1957 in Constanţa) is a former Romanian handball player who competed in the 1984 Summer Olympics.

He was a member of the Romanian handball team which won the bronze medal. He played all six matches and scored two goals.

After retiring from active play with Dinamo Bucharest, he became a coach, managing CSM Călărași, CSM Ploieşti and Energia Lignitul Pandurii Târgu Jiu.

External links
 
 

1957 births
Living people
Sportspeople from Constanța
CS Dinamo București (men's handball) players
Handball players at the 1984 Summer Olympics
Olympic handball players of Romania
Romanian male handball players
Olympic bronze medalists for Romania
Olympic medalists in handball
Medalists at the 1984 Summer Olympics